Banque Bemo Saudi Fransi is a Syrian private bank. BBSF was the first operational private bank in Syria in almost 20 years when it launched its operations on January 4, 2004. Its main shareholders are the Lebanese bank Banque Bemo S.A.L. and the Saudi bank Banque Saudi Fransi.

References

External links
 Official Website

Banks of Syria
Banks established in 2004